Nico Mai (born 9 March 2001) is a German professional footballer who plays as a left-back for Holstein Kiel II.

Career
Mai was born in Magdeburg, and played youth football with 1. FC Magdeburg and VfL Wolfsburg.

He returned to 1. FC Magdeburg on a three-year contract in July 2020. He made his senior debut as a substitute in a 2–0 defeat at home to Viktoria Köln on 3 October 2020. On 31 January 2021, he joined Germania Halberstadt on loan for the second half of the season.

In July 2021, he joined Holstein Kiel II of the Regionalliga Nord on a free transfer.

References

External links
 
 

2001 births
Living people
German footballers
Sportspeople from Magdeburg
Footballers from Saxony-Anhalt
Association football fullbacks
1. FC Magdeburg players
VfB Germania Halberstadt players
Holstein Kiel II players
3. Liga players
21st-century German people